This is a list of plantations and/or plantation houses in the U.S. state of South Carolina that are National Historic Landmarks, listed on the National Register of Historic Places, listed on a heritage register, or are otherwise significant for their history, association with significant events or people, or their architecture and design.

See also

History of slavery in South Carolina
List of plantations in the United States
Plantations of Leon County, Florida
Barbados Slave Code

References

South Carolina